WMYO-CD, virtual channel 24 (UHF digital channel 18), is a low-powered, Class A Laff-affiliated television station licensed to Louisville, Kentucky, United States. The station is owned by New Albany Broadcasting Co., Inc. WMYO-CD's studios are located on Potters Lane in Clarksville, Indiana, and its transmitter is located in the Louisville tower farm in Floyd County (northeast of Floyds Knobs).

On cable, the station is available on Charter Spectrum digital channel 138 and on AT&T U-verse channel 24.

History

The station was founded on June 22, 1994, as W24BW (although it had a construction permit as W62BM) and first signed on the air on March 1, 1996. It was founded by Greater Louisville Communications, Inc. (owned by local businessmen Jerome Hutchinson, Sr. and Jerome Hutchinson, Jr.). From the late 1990s until 2003, the station carried music video programming from MuchUSA (now Fuse TV), the U.S. counterpart of the Canadian music video network MuchMusic. In 2003, the station switched its affiliation to America One, and began airing community and regional programming as well as sporting events. Channel 24's first chief engineer, Virgil Baldon, Jr. (1994–1997), had the foresight to install a forward-compatible Acrodyne analog-to-digital convertible solid-state transmitter when W24BW began operations, over ten years ahead of the 2009 digital television transition. Baldon also oversaw the change of the transmitting antenna's directional main beam to 135 degrees true for maximum signal over the city of Louisville. Baldon was the first African-American engineer to oversee and successfully launch a TV station in the state of Kentucky.

In 2007, the Cascade Broadcasting Group, then-owners of Campbellsville-based WBKI-TV (channel 34), began operating W24BW under a local marketing agreement; the station moved its operations into WBKI's studio facility off Blankenbaker Parkway in Jeffersontown. The LMA also included a purchase option to buy the station. Cascade tried to rebrand channel 24 as the "Louisville Network" (or "LouNET"), and aired locally produced programs that were geared primarily towards the market's African American and Hispanic community. The station also began to brand under the fictional "WYCS" call letters (standing for "Your Community Station"), to avert confusion with other local translator stations which just transmitted completely automated content straight from their network's satellites.

Greater Louisville Broadcasting later sold channel 24 to New Albany Broadcasting Co., Inc. On November 10, 2009, the station changed its call sign to W24BW-D, upon beginning digital operation. On May 20, 2010, the station changed its call sign to WKYI-CD, denoting its status as a class A digital television station.

In January 2015, WKYI-CD took over the affiliation of This TV on 24.2 in place of WAVE, which was required by a company-wide agreement to offer the new male-focused subchannel Grit instead. This programming is mainly carried in the mornings, primetime and overnights on the station rather than the full 24/7 service.

The station changed its call sign to WBKI-CD on December 27, 2017, and to WMYO-CD on February 12, 2018.

Digital television

Digital channels
The station's digital signal is multiplexed:

Programming
Syndicated programs broadcast on WMYO-CD have previously included Tyler Perry's Meet the Browns, Tyler Perry's House of Payne Bridezillas, OK! TV, Cold Squad, The Better Show and The Daily Buzz. It still airs some of these same programs though fewer due to carrying much of Laff's network programming, but also has picked up different syndicated shows to its lineup such as Dog the Bounty Hunter and Judge Faith.

References

External links

Charge! (TV network) affiliates
This TV affiliates
Laff (TV network) affiliates
Ion Mystery affiliates
Low-power television stations in the United States
Television channels and stations established in 1996
MYO-CD
1996 establishments in Kentucky